This is a list of flag bearers who have represented Albania at the Olympics.

Flag bearers carry the national flag of their country at the opening ceremony of the Olympic Games.

Summer Olympics

Winter Olympics

See also
Albania at the Olympics

References

Albania at the Olympics
Albania
Olympic